Victor Contamin (1840–1893) was a French structural engineer, an expert on the strength of materials such as iron and steel.
He is known for the Galerie des machines of the Exposition Universelle (1889) in Paris.
He also pioneered the use of reinforced concrete.

Career

Victor Contamin was born in Paris in 1840. 
He was admitted to the École centrale des arts et manufactures in Paris in 1857, and graduated in second place in 1860.
One of his teachers was Jean-Baptiste-Charles-Joseph Bélanger, a disciple of Gaspard-Gustave Coriolis.
Bélanger treated Contamin with great affection, and gave him much advice when he left the school.

Contamin's first work experience was in Spain. 
In 1863, he joined the Chemins de Fer du Nord railway company as a designer, attached to the department responsible for the tracks. 
He was successively promoted to Inspector, Engineer (1876), and Chief Engineer (1890).
He also taught the course on Applied Mechanics at the École centrale from 1865 to 1873, and then held the chair of Applied Resistance until 1891.
In 1874 Contamin published a textbook entitled Cours de résistance appliquée.

As a recognized expert on the strength of materials, in 1886 Contamin was made responsible for control of metal structures in the 1889 exposition.  
He was to study all plans and projects in terms of the strength requirements for the buildings. 
He was also responsible for checking receipt of materials, strength testing, and monitoring the erection of iron structures.
His approval of the quality of the materials, workshop production and on-site work was required for release of public funds.
As he noted in a letter to La revue le Travail in December 1888, the importance of this work was often not appreciated by the public.

Contamin and his team checked all the calculations and all the metal installations, including the  tower that Gustave Eiffel was building.
He said of the Eiffel Tower:

Contamin was one of the pioneers of the use of reinforced concrete.
He worked with Anatole de Baudot (1834–1915) on a design for the Saint-Jean-de-Montmartre church, Paris, that used this material, built between 1894–1897.

Contamin died in 1893.

Galerie des Machines
Contamin worked with the architect Ferdinand Dutert (1845–1906) on the design of the Galerie des Machines for the 1889 exposition.
Contamin was responsible for the technical design of the Galerie des Machines, including calculations to ensure the structural integrity of the immense arches.
There were no internal supports.
The iron and glass structure used three-pin hinged arches, which had been developed for bridge building.
This was the first time the portal arch had been used on such a large scale.
The Galerie des Machines was re-used for the 1900 exposition, and demolished in 1910.

Many of the writers who discussed the Galerie des Machines gave Victor Contamin much of the credit, since they assumed it was primarily an engineering feat.
However, more recently writers have given greater credit to Dutert.
Eugène Hénard, who assisted Dutert, said the Palais des Machines successfully combined aesthetic appearance with engineering function.
The two goals were complementary.

Gallery

References
Notes

Citations

Sources

External links
The Palais des Machines of 1889. Historical - structural reflections Paper written by Isaac López César & Javier Estévez Cimadevila about the structure of The Galerie des Machines

1840 births
1893 deaths
French engineers